Archidendropsis lentiscifolia is a species of flowering plant in the family Fabaceae. It is found only in New Caledonia. It is threatened by habitat loss.

References

lentiscifolia
Endemic flora of New Caledonia
Vulnerable plants
Taxonomy articles created by Polbot